Team Sweden represents Sweden in women's international roller derby.  The team was first formed to compete at the 2011 Roller Derby World Cup, and finished the tournament in sixth place.

Sweden's first bout was on 8 October 2011, against Team Finland in Helsinki, in what Stockholm Roller Derby claimed was "the world's first Roller Derby bout between two nations".  Sweden won by 135 points to 71.  One of the team's skaters predicted that Sweden would finish in the top five at the World Cup.

At the World Cup, Sweden lost their quarter final to Australia by 126 points to 80, then beat New Zealand and lost to Finland in the consolations stage, to finish in sixth place.

Team roster

2011 team roster
During the first tryout for the team, three skaters suffered fractures.  Nineteen of the team's initial twenty-skater roster came from Women's Flat Track Derby Association-affiliated leagues, the large majority from the Crime City Rollers and Stockholm Roller Derby. The list below is the roster used for Team Sweden's appearance at the 2011 Roller Derby World Cup, with the skaters' league affiliations being those as of at the time of the announcement:

Coaching staff
Swede Hurt
Mad Maloony
Sloppy Boggins
Fluke Skywalker

References

Sweden
Roller derby
Roller derby in Sweden
2011 establishments in Sweden
Sports clubs established in 2011